Fantastica Mania 2016 was a series of six professional wrestling events in Japan, co-produced by the Japanese promotion New Japan Pro-Wrestling (NJPW) and the Mexican promotion Consejo Mundial de Lucha Libre (CMLL), which took place between January 17 and 24, 2016. The 2016 shows were the sixth time that NJPW and CMLL had co-promoted shows in Japan under the Fantastica Mania name. Much like the previous year, the 2016 tour featured six shows in total. The first five events featured seven matches each with the final event featuring eight matches. Six of the matches were contested for championships owned by CMLL. The 2016 tour was the first time the joint show was held in Kōchi, Kōchi, while it had previously been held in the other three cities; Kyoto, Osaka and Tokyo.

Background
The 2016 Fantastica Mania series was the sixth year in a row where Japanese wrestling promotion New Japan Pro-Wrestling (NJPW) had promoted a series of shows in Japan along with their Mexican partner promotion Consejo Mundial de Lucha Libre (CMLL). The 2016 series of shows were show 19 through 24, a total of six shows. The final three shows aired live on NJPW World. The opening show in Kōchi, Kōchi on January 17 would be the first time Fantastica Mania had taken place in the city. The tour was announced October 24, 2015, with the CMLL participants announced on November 16. The tour marks the NJPW debuts of Bobby Z, Dragon Lee, Guerrero Maya Jr., Hechicero, The Panther and Virus. Returning CMLL participants include Atlantis, Bárbaro Cavernario, Fuego, Mephisto, Místico, Okumura, Stuka Jr., Titán, Último Guerrero and Volador Jr. CMLL ring announcer Evan was also announced for the tour. Máscara Dorada, who signed with NJPW during the Fantastica Mania 2015 tour, would also take part in the 2016 tour. The most notable CMLL wrestlers missing the tour were Marco Corleone, La Máscara, Rush and La Sombra of Los Ingobernables. Three days after the CMLL participants were revealed, the reason for La Sombra missing the tour was announced; he had signed with WWE.

For the first time in Fantastica Mania history, the entire tour not only sold out, but did so a month in advance. The cards for all six events were released on January 6, 2016. It was announced that the events would mark NJPW rookies Sho Tanaka and Yohei Komatsu's final appearances for the promotion, before leaving on an indefinite learning excursion to CMLL. Meanwhile, the January 24 event would include Máscara Dorada's final match under a NJPW contract. The card for the final event was changed on January 23 with the addition of a title match featuring Kamaitachi, NJPW's previous rookie sent on a learning excursion. His surprise return on the January 23 event marked his first NJPW appearance since May 2013.

Results

January 17

January 19

January 20

January 22

January 23

January 24

See also
2016 in professional wrestling

References

2016 in Tokyo
2016 in professional wrestling
2016
January 2016 events in Japan